Enrique López may refer to:

 Enrique López Albújar (1872-1966), Peruvian writer
 Enriquito López (1956-2016), Dominican politician
 Enrique López Zarza (born 1957), Mexican football forward
 Enrique López López (born 1963), Spanish judge and politician
 Kike López (born 1988), Spanish football right-back
 Enrique López Pérez (born 1991), Spanish tennis player
Enrique López Lavigne, Spanish film producer
 Enrique López Fernández (born 1995), Spanish football left-back better known as Cadete

See also
 Henry López (disambiguation)